Macropelopiini is a tribe of midges in the non-biting midge family (Chironomidae).

Genera & species
Genus Apsectrotanypus Fittkau, 1962
A. trifascipennis (Zetterstedt, 1838)
Genus Macropelopia Thienemann, 1916
M. adaucta Kieffer in Thienemann & Kieffer, 1916
M. nebulosa (Meigen, 1804)
M. notata (Meigen, 1818)
Genus Psectrotanypus Kieffer, 1909
Subgenus Psectrotanypus Kieffer, 1909
P. varius (Fabricius, 1787)

References

Tanypodinae
Diptera tribes